The 2005 AFL season was the 109th season of the Australian Football League (AFL), the highest level senior Australian rules football competition in Australia, which was known as the Victorian Football League until 1989. The season featured sixteen clubs, ran from 24 March until 24 September, and comprised a 22-game home-and-away season followed by a finals series featuring the top eight clubs.

The premiership was won by the Sydney Swans for the fourth time, after it defeated  by four points in the AFL Grand Final. It was the club's first premiership since it won the 1933 premiership as South Melbourne, and ended a 72-year premiership drought which stands as the longest in league history.

Wizard Home Loans Cup

 defeated  1.14.18 (111) to 1.11.9 (84) in the Grand Final.

Premiership season

Round 1 (Easter and season launch)

Round 2

Round 3 (Rivalry Round)

Round 4

Round 5 (ANZAC Day)

Round 6

Round 7 (Mother's Day)

Round 8

Round 9 (Community Weekend)

Round 10

Round 11

Round 12 (Queen's Birthday)

Round 13 (Split Round)

Round 14 (Family Round)

Round 15

Round 16

Round 17

Round 18

Round 19

Round 20 (Heritage Round)

Round 21

Round 22

Ladder

Ladder progression

Finals series

Week one

Week two

Week three

Week four

Awards
Ben Cousins received 20 votes to beat fellow West Coast midfielder Daniel Kerr.
They became the first team in AFL history to win the pre-season competition and then finish last in the season proper.

Player moves
 30 players retired from the game, including Matthew Primus, Nick Holland, Martin Pike, Wayne Campbell, Justin Murphy, Brenton Sanderson, Austinn Jones, Angelo Lekkas, Phil Matera, Jason Ball and Stuart Maxfield. Shane Woewodin, a Brownlow Medallist was delisted.

Post-season matches
 Essendon coach Kevin Sheedy coached the Australians to a 2–0 victory in the 2005 International Rules Series against Ireland. Andrew McLeod won the Jim Stynes Medal.
 Fremantle defeated West Coast Eagles by 17 points in an Exhibition match played in London.
 Sydney and the Kangaroos played an Exhibition match in the United States at UCLA, with the Kangaroos winning by 48 points.

Notable events
Three players celebrated 200th game milestones against eventual premiers the Sydney Swans during the regular season:
Fraser Gehrig, round 10
Jeff White, round 16
Scott Lucas, round 19

Additionally, Michael Voss played his 250th AFL game and Mal Michael his 100th club game for the Lions, both also against the Swans, in round 3.

References

 2005 Season – AFL Tables

2005
AFL season